UFC Fight Night: Condit vs. Kampmann (also known as UFC Fight Night 18) was a mixed martial arts event held by the Ultimate Fighting Championship (UFC) on April 1, 2009.

Background
The event was broadcast on Spike TV and served as a lead in to the premiere of The Ultimate Fighter: United States vs. United Kingdom.

This event was the UFC's first event in the state of Tennessee and it set the record in terms of attendance to date for both an MMA event in the state and a UFC Fight Night show.

The main event featured the debut of former WEC Welterweight Champion Carlos Condit – riding an eight fight win streak – in the main event against Martin Kampmann.  Kampmann won the fight via split decision.  However, the fight was close enough that FightMetric ruled the bout a draw.

The event drew a total of 1.9 million viewers.

Results

Bonus awards
Fighters were awarded $30,000 bonuses.

Fight of the Night: Tyson Griffin vs. Rafael dos Anjos
Knockout of the Night: Aaron Simpson
Submission of the Night: Rob Kimmons

See also
 Ultimate Fighting Championship
 List of UFC champions
 List of UFC events
 2009 in UFC

References

UFC Fight Night
2009 in mixed martial arts
Mixed martial arts in Tennessee
Sports competitions in Nashville, Tennessee
2009 in sports in Tennessee
Events in Nashville, Tennessee